CenterTelecom (Open Joint-Stock Company Central Telecommunication Company) was a fixed-wire telecommunications service provider and Internet service provider in Russia. It was ranked 5th among Russian telecom companies, after Rostelecom, MTS, Vympelcom and MegaFon. 50.69% of Centertelecom's voting stock was held by the Svyazinvest Holding Company. CenterTelecom was listed on the MICEX and RTS stock exchanges under the symbol ESMO.

History
The company was established in the late 19th century when the Moscow postal telegraph district was initiated. From 1922–1926, the Post and Telegraph Offices Division under the Moscow Soviet was reorganized as the Communication Department of Moscow District. On 20 June 1994, the Open Joint-Stock Company Elektrosvyaz of Moscow region was established, and in 2001 the company was named OJSC CenterTelecom.

In 2002, 17 regional telecommunication companies merged into CenterTelecom, consolidated on the base of the Moscow region operator. On 1 April 2011, the company merged with Rostelecom.

Operations
The company had following branches:

Belgorod
Bryansk
Kaluga
Kursk
Lipetsk
Moscow
Orel
Ryazan
Smolensk
Tambov
Tver
Tula
Verhnevolzhskiy
Vladimir
Voronezh

External links

Centertelecom - English language
Centertelecom - Russian language
Svyaz'invest - Russian language and English language

Cable television companies of Russia
Svyazinvest
Companies based in Moscow
Defunct companies of Russia